New Haven Township may refer to the following places in the United States:

 New Haven Township, Gallatin County, Illinois
 New Haven Township, Gratiot County, Michigan
 New Haven Township, Shiawassee County, Michigan
 New Haven Township, Olmsted County, Minnesota
 New Haven Township, Franklin County, Missouri
 New Haven Township, Huron County, Ohio

See also

New Haven (disambiguation)

Township name disambiguation pages